The Binghamton Crosbys (commonly referred to as The Crosbys) are a TTBB a cappella group at Binghamton University in Binghamton, New York, USA. They are four-time national championship finalists and won the International Championship of Collegiate A Cappella (ICCA) in 2003.

History 
The second independent music club recognized by the university, the Crosbys were founded in 1983 and remain the only TTBB a cappella singing group at Binghamton University. Like many collegiate a cappella groups, they are rooted in traditions tied to certain social events, attire, or means of address. The Crosbys usually perform in jeans and blazers; their alumni song — a collegiate a cappella tradition in which alumni present at the concert may join current members to sing — is "Strike Up the Band" (aka Jack).  They undertake a two-week tour each winter, succeeded by The Jam, a large performance at the end of each semester.

The Crosbys typically compete in the ICCA competition every few years, as do many prestigious collegiate a cappella groups. They have progressed to the national championship round four times in the twenty-five years of the ICCA's existence, performing at Carnegie Hall, Lincoln Center, and winning the trophy during the finals held in 2003 at the Beacon Theatre on Broadway. They have also won many other awards at this competition, such as Best Soloist, Best Arrangement and Best Choreography.

In 1985, under the pseudonym Cliffs Notes (in honor of then school president Clifford Clark), the group was chosen as the winner of the campus-held Maxwell House Talent Competition for their performance of "Only You", which was to become a signature song of the group.

Discography

See also
 The Pegs

References

External links 
Official site
Binghamton University

Crosbys
Musical groups established in the 1980s
University choirs